The Venucia T60 is a subcompact CUV produced by the Chinese car manufacturer Venucia since 2018.

Overview

The Venucia T60 was launched on to the Chinese auto market during the 2018 Guangzhou Auto Show in November 2018 with a price range from 85,800 yuan to 118,800 yuan.

The Venucia T60 is powered by a Nissan-sourced 1.6 liter engine producing 126 hp (93 kW) and 154N·m mated to a CVT.

Venucia T60EV

The Venucia T60EV is the electric version of the Venucia T60 crossover. It was revealed during the 2019 Shanghai Auto Show alongside the D60EV electric sedan.

The Venucia T60 EV is equipped with a 60.7 kWh battery delivering an NEDC range of 442 km (276 miles). The Venucia T60s drivetrain produces 120 kW (161 hp) and 250 N.m (184 lb.ft) of torque and a top speed of 125 km/h / 78 mph. The energy consumption of the Venucia T60 EV is 14.7 kWh/100km.

References

External links

T60
Subcompact cars
Crossover sport utility vehicles
Front-wheel-drive vehicles
Vehicles with CVT transmission
2010s cars
Cars introduced in 2018
Cars of China
Production electric cars